Channel One or channel 1 may refer to:

Television networks and channels
Channel One (Albania)  - Albania 
10 Bold, an Australian television channel formerly known as One  - Australia 
Channel 1 (Bangladeshi TV channel) - Bangladeshi
BNT 1 -  Bulgaria
One (Canadian TV channel) - Canada 
Canal 1 - Colombia
Dubai One, Middle East and North Africa - Dubai
TF1, French flagship television channel from TF1 Group - France
One (German TV channel) - Germany 
Channel 1 (Iran) - Iran
RTÉ One, Irish flagship television channel from RTÉ  - Ireland
Channel 1 (Israel) - Israel 
Rai 1, Italian flagship television channel from Rai  -Italy
One (Maltese TV channel) - Malta
Azteca Uno, a television network in Mexico using virtual channel 1 - Mexico
C1 Television -  Mongolia
NPO 1, Dutch flagship television channel from the Nederlandse Publieke Omroep -Netherlands
Channel 1 (North American TV), a defunct channel - ?
Channel One Russia - Russia
Soviet TV Channel 1, a defunct flagship television channel from the All-Soviet State Television and Radio Broadcasting Company - USSR
Channel 1 (Syrian TV channel) - Syria 
Channel One (British and Irish TV channel), a defunct channel in the UK - UK 
BBC One, British flagship television channel from the BBC - UK
NY1, a channel in New York - USA

Other uses
Channel One (band), an Irish rock band
Channel One Studios, a recording studios in Kingston, Jamaica
"Channel One", two techno releases by Juan Atkins
Channel One News, a school television program in the United States

See also
Channel 1 branded TV stations in the United States
Channel 1 virtual TV stations in the United States
TV1 (disambiguation), includes TV One and TVOne
1TV (disambiguation)

01